Bernardo Borbón Vilches (born 3 July 1941) is a Mexican politician from the National Action Party. From 2000 to 2003 he served as Deputy of the LVIII Legislature of the Mexican Congress representing Baja California, and previously served in the XIII Legislature of the Congress of Baja California.

References

1941 births
Living people
Politicians from Sonora
National Action Party (Mexico) politicians
20th-century Mexican politicians
21st-century Mexican politicians
People from Etchojoa Municipality
Members of the Congress of Baja California
Deputies of the LVIII Legislature of Mexico
Members of the Chamber of Deputies (Mexico) for Baja California